Makoto Kano is the name of:
Makoto Kano (figure skater) (born 1966), Japanese figure skater
Makoto Kano (video game designer) (born 1950), Nintendo employee